Estur (also Romanized as Esţūr and Estūr; also known as Istor, Īstowr, and Osţūr) is a village in Balvard Rural District, in the Central District of Sirjan County, Kerman Province, Iran. At the 2006 census, its population was 348, in 81 families.

References 

Populated places in Sirjan County